Andrena angustior  is a Palearctic species of  mining bee.

References

External links
Images representing Andrena angustior 

Hymenoptera of Europe
angustior
Insects described in 1802